Robert Alan Person (born October 6, 1969) is an American former Major League Baseball pitcher who played nine seasons in Major League Baseball: two for the New York Mets, two and a half for the Toronto Blue Jays, three and a half for the Philadelphia Phillies, and only seven games pitched for the Boston Red Sox in the last year of his career.

Career
In the 1992 MLB expansion draft, the Florida Marlins drafted him 47th overall, he then became a free agent, and signed again with the Marlins.

Person became a Phillie in  when the Blue Jays swapped him for Paul Spoljaric. Granted free agency after the  season, he joined the Red Sox for a short and unsuccessful stint.

Injuries were the Achilles heel (quite literally), preventing Person from achieving sustained success.

Person's most memorable feat came with the Philadelphia Phillies on June 2, 2002. He not only threw five strong innings in which he allowed three hits and one unearned run while striking out five, but he also hit two home runs against the Montreal Expos. The first home run was a grand slam to left field off Bruce Chen with two outs in the first inning; the second was a three-run home run to left field off  Masato Yoshii with one out in the fifth inning. In between those home runs, he came up again with the bases loaded and drove a ball far enough for a second slam, but it was foul and he ended up striking out.

Person's best season as a pitcher came in  when he went 9-7 with a 3.63 ERA and 164 strikeouts in 173.1 innings. He posted 3.9 Wins Above Replacement, the best mark of his career.

Before Person's grand slam, Jeff Juden was the last Phillies pitcher to hit a grand slam: August 25, against the Los Angeles Dodgers. Randy Lerch had been the last Phillies pitcher before Person to hit two home runs in a game, a feat that he accomplished on September 30, .

While in Philadelphia, Person had his own fan club named "Person's People".

Person played college baseball for the University of Arkansas.  He played high school baseball at University City High School in St. Louis.

References

External links

Robert Person at Pura Pelota (Venezuelan Professional Baseball League)

1969 births
Living people
African-American baseball players
American expatriate baseball players in Canada
Arkansas Razorbacks baseball players
Baseball players from Missouri
Bend Bucks players
Binghamton Mets players
Boston Red Sox players
Bridgeport Bluefish players
Burlington Indians players (1986–2006)
Cardenales de Lara players
American expatriate baseball players in Venezuela
Charlotte Knights players
Clearwater Phillies players
Dunedin Blue Jays players
Gulf Coast Red Sox players
High Desert Mavericks players
Kinston Indians players
Major League Baseball pitchers
New York Mets players
Norfolk Tides players
Pawtucket Red Sox players
Philadelphia Phillies players
Reading Phillies players
Sarasota Red Sox players
Scranton/Wilkes-Barre Red Barons players
Seminole State Trojans baseball players
South Bend White Sox players
Sportspeople from Lowell, Massachusetts
Syracuse SkyChiefs players
Toronto Blue Jays players
Watertown Indians players
21st-century African-American people
20th-century African-American sportspeople
Gulf Coast Indians players
Sarasota White Sox players